Fairfield is a suburb of the City of Brisbane, Queensland, Australia.

Geography
The suburb is mainly residential with house and unit accommodation.

Fairfield is bounded to the north by the South Brisbane Cemetery, to the east by the Beenleigh railway line, to the south by Venner Road and to the west by the median of the Brisbane River.

History 
Samuel Grimes and brother George Grimes immigrated to Queensland on the Chaseley in 1849, one of the ships chartered by Dr John Dunmore Lang. In 1857 they established an arrowroot farm called Fairfield in the area, providing the name for the suburb.

The Fairfield Baptist Church opened for worship on 24 December (Christmas Eve) 1865 followed by a celebratory luncheon on 26 December (Boxing Day) 1865 as a branch of the Vulture Street Baptist Church. In 1889 a new church was erected, with a stump-capping ceremony on Saturday 2 March 1889. By 1927 it was decided that the church needed a more prominent location, eventually culminating in the relocation of the church building to 470 Ipswich Road, Annerley, where it was refurbished before re-opening there as Annerley Baptist Church on Saturday 9 February 1935 by Reverend J.C. Farquhar.

In 1914 the Railside Estate was a subdivision of 28 residential lots for the land bounded by Bell Lane (now Bledisloe Street) to the north, the South Coast railway line to the east, Venner Road to the south, and Cross Street to the west. The estate was described as "within a stones throw from the Fairfield railway station".

Parts of Fairfield were flooded in the 1974 floods.

The Fairfield Library opened in 1988 with a major refurbishment in 2011.

Parts of Fairfield were flooded in the January 2011 Brisbane flood.

The median age of the Fairfield population was 31 years of age, 6 years below the Australian median. 69.2% of people living in Fairfield were born in Australia, compared to the national average of 69.8%; the next most common countries of birth were England 3.2%, New Zealand 3.1%, Malaysia 1.5%, China 1.2%, Vietnam 1.2%. 77.3% of people spoke only English at home; the next most popular languages were 2.4% Mandarin, 2% Greek, 1.7% Vietnamese, 1.7% Spanish, 0.9% German.

Education 
There are no schools in Fairfield. The nearest government primary schools are in the neighbouring suburbs of Dutton Park, Annerley (Junction Park State School) and Yeronga (Yeronga State School). The nearest government secondary school is Yeronga State High School in Yeronga.

A new government secondary school, Inner City South Secondary College, is expected to open in neighbouring Dutton Park in 2021.

Amenities
Fairfield has a Skate Park that caters for young people in the suburb.

Fairfield Gardens is a shopping centre at 180 Fairfield Road. The main shop in the centre is a Coles supermarket.  It also has a Fairfield Gardens Chemist (used to be called Terry White Chemist), Australia Post, BWS, Dollars and Cents, Doctors surgery and 7-Eleven fuel station.

The Brisbane City Council operates a public library at Fairfield Gardens.

The suburb borders the Brisbane River and has many parks.

Transport 

There is a Fairfield train station on the line to Beenleigh. The main bus service is the 196, which runs every 15 minutes during the day and commences at Fairfield Gardens. During the morning peak the 107 and 108 bus services are also available. There is also a taxi rank.

References

Further reading

  – includes the history of Fairfield Baptist Church

External links

 

Suburbs of the City of Brisbane